A training management system (TMS), training management software, or training resource management system (TRMS) is a software application for the administration, documentation, tracking, and reporting of instructor-led-training programs. A TMS focuses on back-office processes and is considered a tool for corporate training administrators. A TMS serves as a central enterprise resource planning (ERP) system specific to the training industry. Such a system can be complemented by other learning technologies such as a learning management system, and form part of the educational technology ecosystem.

Purpose 
The training management process includes managing and maintaining training records of any organization. A TMS manages back-office processes for corporate instructor-led-training administration and typically handles session registration, course administration, tracking, effective monitoring and reporting. Some TMSs also manage financial aspects, including budget forecasting and cost-tracking.

TMSs are often used by regulated industries for compliance training.

TMSs can be complemented by other learning technologies such as a learning management system for e-learning management and course delivery.

Technical aspects 
Most TMSs are web-based . TMSs were originally designed to be locally hosted on-premise, where the organization purchases a license to a version of the software, and installs it on their own servers and network. Many TMSs are also offered as SaaS (software as a service), with hosting provided by the vendors.

See also 
 Competency-based management
 Student information system

References 


Learning
Educational software
Administrative software